During the 2018–19 season, Rayo Vallecano are participating in La Liga and Copa del Rey.

Players

Reserve team

Out on loan

Transfers

In

Out

Competitions

Overall

La Liga

League table

Results summary

Results by round

Matches

Copa del Rey

Round of 32

Statistics

Appearances and goals
Last updated on 8 March 2019.

|-
! colspan=14 style=background:#dcdcdc; text-align:center|Goalkeepers

|-
! colspan=14 style=background:#dcdcdc; text-align:center|Defenders

|-
! colspan=14 style=background:#dcdcdc; text-align:center|Midfielders

|-
! colspan=14 style=background:#dcdcdc; text-align:center|Forwards

|-
! colspan=14 style=background:#dcdcdc; text-align:center|Players who have made an appearance this season but have left the club

|-
|}

Goalscorers

References

Rayo Vallecano seasons
Rayo Vallecano